Stylus Magazine was an American online music and film magazine, launched in 2002 and co-founded by Todd L. Burns. It featured long-form music journalism, four daily music reviews, movie reviews, podcasts, an MP3 blog, and a text blog.

Additionally, Stylus had daily features like "The Singles Jukebox", which looked at pop singles from around the globe, and "Soulseeking", a column focused on personal responses in listening. Even though they never reached the readership of other music magazines such as PopMatters or Pitchfork, they still had a very consistent and fired-up audience. In 2006, the site was chosen by the Observer Music Monthly as one of the Internet's 25 most essential music websites.

Stylus closed as a business on 31 October 2007. The site remained online for several years, but did not publish any new content.

On 4 January 2010, with the blessing of former editor Todd Burns, Stylus senior writer Nick Southall launched The Stylus Decade, a website with a new series of lists and essays reviewing music from the previous ten years. It is now also defunct. The Singles Jukebox relaunched with many of the same writers as a stand-alone website in March 2009 and continues today.

Stylus Magazine adopted its name from the part of a record player which makes contact with a vinyl record, called a stylus or a needle.

References

External links
 – official site

Online music magazines published in the United Kingdom
Magazines established in 2002
Magazines disestablished in 2007
Defunct magazines published in the United Kingdom